Pseudathyma legeri, or St Leger's false sergeant, is a butterfly in the family Nymphalidae. It is found in Nigeria, where it is only known from the Obudu Plateau. The habitat consists of sub-montane forests.

References

Endemic fauna of Nigeria
Butterflies described in 1995
Pseudathyma